NMS Kamaraj Polytechnic is a polytechnic college located in Pazhavilai, Kanyakumari District, India.  It is 8 km from N.M.S. Kamaraj Polytechnic College, Pazhavilai was established on 22 September 1982. The Philanthropic and magnanimous people of this area had offered great help for establishing this polytechnic College in the name of the great leader Perunthalaivar. Thiru.K.Kamaraj.

This is the only Government aided Polytechnic College in Kanyakumari District. Now our college functioning with an annual intake of 464 students with seven branches of study.

Courses Offered
In the fiercely competitive environment, infrastructure and vibrant organizational ethics that grants top priority to the needs of students.

Basic Science
Civil Engineering
Mechanical Engineering
Electrical and Electronics Engineering
Electronics and Communication Engineering
Automobile Engineering
Computer EngineeringNagercoil.

References

Engineering colleges in Tamil Nadu
Universities and colleges in Kanyakumari district
Education in Nagercoil
Educational institutions established in 1982
1982 establishments in Tamil Nadu